Japanese formerly Tachikawa Fuchu Athletic FC (立川府中アスレティックFC, Tachikawa Fuchū Asuretikku Efushi) is a professional futsal club, currently playing in the F. League Division 1. The team is located between Tachikawa and Fuchu, Japan. Their main ground is Arena Tachikawa Tachihi. The team changed name to Tachikawa Athletic FC in 2022–23 season.

Chronicle

Trophies 
F.League Ocean Cup:
Winners: 2015

References

External links 
  

Futsal clubs in Japan
Sports teams in Tokyo
Futsal clubs established in 2000
2000 establishments in Japan